COMPAC, the Commonwealth Pacific Cable System, was an undersea telephone cable system connecting Canada with New Zealand and Australia. It was completed by closing the last gap in Honolulu Harbor, Hawaii, at 6:25 a.m. B.S.T. on October 10, 1963. Public service of the cable commenced early in December 1963.

History

COMPAC was developed as a complementary system to CANTAT, the system linking Canada to the United Kingdom, which had begun operating in December 1961. COMPAC was designed to extend west towards Commonwealth nations in the Pacific, linking Vancouver to Auckland, New Zealand and Sydney, Australia, via Honolulu and Suva in Fiji. The Auckland – Sydney section was completed in early 1962, followed by the Auckland – Suva section in July, with the entire system completed by October 1963.

The system cost a total of $100 million and spanned 14,000 miles, from Oban in Scotland via CANTAT to Newfoundland, by microwave link across Canada, then cable on to Hawaii, Suva (Fiji), Auckland (New Zealand), and Sydney (Australia). Three cable ships (CS Mercury, CS Retriever, and HMTS Monarch) laid the cable. The link contains 11,000 miles of telephone cable, which, at the time, provided 80 two-way speech channels or 1,760 teleprinter circuits.  In addition, the cable carried telegraph traffic, leased circuits for airlines, shipping companies and other commercial transmission.

References

Submarine communications cables in the Pacific Ocean
Australia–Canada relations
Canada–New Zealand relations
Canada–Fiji relations
Australia–Fiji relations
Fiji–New Zealand relations
Australia–New Zealand relations
1963 establishments in British Columbia
1963 establishments in Hawaii
1963 establishments in New Zealand
1963 establishments in Australia
1963 establishments in Fiji